The following is a list of filename extensions used by programs in the Microsoft Office suite.

Word 
Legacy Legacy filename extensions denote binary Microsoft Word formatting that became outdated with the release of Microsoft Office 2007. Although the latest version of Microsoft Word can still open them, they are no longer developed. Legacy filename extensions include:
 .doc – Legacy Word document; Microsoft Office refers to them as "Microsoft Word 97 – 2003 Document"
 .dot – Legacy Word templates; officially designated "Microsoft Word 97 – 2003 Template"
 .wbk – Legacy Word document backup; referred as "Microsoft Word Backup Document"

OOXML Office Open XML (OOXML) format was introduced with Microsoft Office 2007 and became the default format of Microsoft Word ever since. Pertaining file extensions include:
 .docx – Word document
 .docm – Word macro-enabled document; same as docx, but may contain macros and scripts
 .dotx – Word template
 .dotm – Word macro-enabled template; same as dotx, but may contain macros and scripts
 .docb – Word binary document introduced in Microsoft Office 2007
 .pdf – PDF documents
 .wll – Word add-in
 .wwl – Word add-in

Excel 
Legacy Legacy filename extensions denote binary Microsoft Excel formats that became outdated with the release of Microsoft Office 2007. Although the latest version of Microsoft Excel can still open them, they are no longer developed. Legacy filename extensions include:
 .xls – Legacy Excel worksheets; officially designated "Microsoft Excel 97-2003 Worksheet"
 .xlt – Legacy Excel templates; officially designated "Microsoft Excel 97-2003 Template"
 .xlm – Legacy Excel macro
 .xll_ – Excel 4 for Mac add-in
 .xla_ - Excel 4 for Mac add-in
 .xla5 – Excel 5 for Mac add-in
 .xla8 – Excel 98 for Mac add-in

OOXML Office Open XML (OOXML) format was introduced with Microsoft Office 2007 and became the default format of Microsoft Excel ever since. Excel-related file extensions of this format include:
 .xlsx – Excel workbook
 .xlsm – Excel macro-enabled workbook; same as xlsx but may contain macros and scripts
 .xltx – Excel template
 .xltm – Excel macro-enabled template; same as xltx but may contain macros and scripts

Other formats Microsoft Excel uses dedicated file formats that are not part of OOXML, and use the following extensions:
 .xlsb – Excel binary worksheet (BIFF12)
 .xla  – Excel add-in that can contain macros
 .xlam – Excel macro-enabled add-in
 .xll  – Excel XLL add-in; a form of DLL-based add-in
 .xlw  – Excel work space; previously known as "workbook"

PowerPoint 
Legacy
 .ppt – Legacy PowerPoint presentation
 .pot – Legacy PowerPoint template
 .pps – Legacy PowerPoint slideshow
 .ppa – PowerPoint (2007?) add-in
 .ppam – PowerPoint 2007 add-in with macros enabled

OOXML
 .pptx – PowerPoint presentation
 .pptm – PowerPoint macro-enabled presentation
 .potx – PowerPoint template
 .potm – PowerPoint macro-enabled template
 .ppam – PowerPoint add-in
 .ppsx – PowerPoint slideshow
 .ppsm – PowerPoint macro-enabled slideshow
 .sldx – PowerPoint slide
 .sldm – PowerPoint macro-enabled slide
 .pa – PowerPoint add-in

Access 

Microsoft Access 2007 introduced new file extensions:
 .ACCDA – Access add-in file
 .ACCDB – The file extension for the new Office Access 2007 file format. This takes the place of the MDB file extension. 
 .ACCDE – The file extension for Office Access 2007 files that are in "execute only" mode. ACCDE files have all Visual Basic for Applications (VBA) source code hidden. A user of an ACCDE file can only execute VBA code, but not view or modify it. ACCDE takes the place of the MDE file extension.
 .ACCDT – The file extension for Access Database Templates.
 .ACCDR – is a new file extension that enables you to open a database in runtime mode. By simply changing a database's file extension from .accdb to .accdr, you can create a "locked-down" version of your Office Access database. You can change the file extension back to .accdb to restore full functionality.
 .ACCDU – Access add-in file
 .MDA – Access add-in file
 .MDE – Access add-in file

OneNote 
 .one – OneNote export file

Outlook 
 .ecf – Outlook 2013+ add-in file

Billing

Publisher 
 .pub – a Microsoft Publisher publication

XPS Document
 .xps – a XML-based document format used for printing (on Windows Vista and later) and preserving documents.

See also 
 Microsoft Office
 Microsoft Office XML formats
 Filename extension
 Alphabetical list of file extensions
 Office Open XML

External links 
 Introducing the Microsoft Office (2007) Open XML File Formats
 Introduction to new file-name extensions

References 

__NO

File extensions
Office Open XML